Gregg Matthew Berhalter (born August 1, 1973) is an American soccer coach and former player who was most recently the head coach of the United States men's national soccer team. Berhalter previously coached Columbus Crew SC in Major League Soccer, Hammarby IF in Sweden, and served as an assistant coach for LA Galaxy.

Playing career

Early life and education
Gregg Matthew Berhalter was born on August 1, 1973, in Englewood, New Jersey, and grew up in Tenafly, New Jersey, and was a high school teammate of Claudio Reyna at Saint Benedict's Preparatory School in Newark, New Jersey. He played college soccer at the University of North Carolina at Chapel Hill. In 1993, he spent the collegiate off season playing for the Raleigh Flyers of the USISL. Berhalter is the godson of Boston Red Sox Hall of Fame baseball player Carl Yastrzemski.

Professional

Berhalter left UNC after his junior year, signing with Dutch club Zwolle in 1994. He later played for Sparta Rotterdam and SC Cambuur Leeuwarden in the Netherlands (later they also had U.S.-born executive Alex Pama there), and with Crystal Palace in England (where he briefly played alongside Jovan Kirovski). During his time at Crystal Palace, he scored once against Bradford City.

In 2002, Berhalter signed with Energie Cottbus of the German Bundesliga. He went on to make 111 league appearances with the team, captaining them to a promotion back to the Bundesliga. In 2006, Berhalter signed with TSV 1860 Munich of the 2. Bundesliga, and was named captain of the team. He stayed there for a further two and a half years, making 73 league appearances for Die Löwen.

After a 15-year career in Europe, Berhalter moved back to the United States in April 2009. He signed a contract with Major League Soccer, his first club contract in his home country. He was revealed as a Los Angeles Galaxy player on April 3, 2009. In his first season with the Galaxy, their goals against were cut in half—from 61 to 30—with Berhalter being a leader in defense while mentoring Omar Gonzalez to Rookie of the Year honors.

On November 14, 2009, he scored in the 103rd minute of the scoreless Western Conference final, propelling the Galaxy to a 2–0 win over the Houston Dynamo and into the 2009 MLS Cup. It was his first goal in 28 appearances with the club.

In his second season, the Galaxy won the MLS Supporters Shield and further reduced their goals against to 26 for the season, a Galaxy record.

On October 12, 2011, Berhalter announced his decision to retire at the end of the 2011 MLS season.

International
Berhalter earned his first cap for the U.S. national team on October 15, 1994, against Saudi Arabia. Berhalter played a significant role for the U.S. at the 2002 World Cup, stepping in for the injured Jeff Agoos and starting the last two games, and in doing so became the first Crystal Palace player to play in a World Cup match.

On May 25, 2006, Berhalter was added to the U.S. national team's roster for the 2006 World Cup, replacing the injured Cory Gibbs. Berhalter expressed confidence in the ability of the team in the run up to the tournament, but was an unused substitute in all three group games. The U.S. was eliminated after finishing at the bottom of Group E in the first round with one draw and two defeats.

Coaching career

Hammarby IF
Following a season as Los Angeles Galaxy's assistant coach, Berhalter was named head coach for Swedish club Hammarby IF on December 12, 2011. At the time, the team was playing in Superettan, the second-tier. Although it is a common misconception, Berhalter was not the first American to ever manage a professional soccer team in Europe. The first American to ever manage a professional soccer team in Europe was Thomas Dooley, who managed  1. FC Saarbrücken during the 2002-2003 season. Berhalter was fired on July 24, 2013, for a "lack of attacking play". Hammarby were in eighth place at the time of the sacking.

Columbus Crew SC
Berhalter became the sporting director and head coach of Columbus Crew on November 6, 2013.

Under Berhalter, Columbus Crew SC qualified for the playoffs in 2014, 2015, 2017 and 2018. They reached the MLS Cup 2015 but lost at home 2–1 to the Portland Timbers.

United States
On December 2, 2018, Berhalter became the head coach of the United States national team. He earned his first victory as coach in a friendly against Panama on January 27, 2019. Berhalter coached the United States to a continental championship on August 1, 2021, at the 2021 CONCACAF Gold Cup. On November 12, 2021, Berhalter led the United States to a 2-0 victory over rival Mexico in World Cup Qualifying at TQL Stadium in Cincinnati, Ohio. The team subsequently qualified for and reached the round of 16 in the 2022 FIFA World Cup.

Personal life
Berhalter lives in the Lake View neighborhood of Chicago with his wife Rosalind, with whom he has four children. One of his sons, Sebastian, plays for the Vancouver Whitecaps. His brother, Jay, served as the chief commercial officer of the United States Soccer Federation until his resignation in 2020. 

On January 3, 2023, Berhalter issued a statement saying that in 1991, he had kicked his future wife in the legs after an argument. The U.S. Soccer Federation said it was investigating what had happened. It was later revealed that it was Danielle Egan, mother of Giovanni Reyna, who contacted the U.S. Soccer Federation about the incident "because she was frustrated by comments made about her son after the team's elimination from the 2022 World Cup." Berhalter publicly addressed issues regarding an anonymous player for a lack of commitment and poor attitude, and confirmed that the team had held a meeting to determine if that player were to remain with the team in Qatar for the remainder of the tournament. On December 12, 2022, Reyna confirmed that he was the aforementioned player about whom Berhalter was speaking, and apologized for his behavior while criticizing the decision to publicize the information.

On 13 March 2023, the U.S. Soccer Federation said a probe into the dispute with Berhalter's wife had concluded U.S. Soccer was not in the wrong for hiring him as the national team coach.  The conclusions mean there is now no legal impediment to employing Berhalter, who remains a candidate for the coaching job.

Coaching statistics

Honors

Player
Los Angeles Galaxy
 MLS Cup: 2011
 Major League Soccer Supporters' Shield: 2010, 2011
 Major League Soccer Western Conference Championship: 2009, 2011

Coach
United States
 CONCACAF Nations League: 2019–20
 CONCACAF Gold Cup: 2021

References

External links

 
 

1973 births
Living people
People from Englewood, New Jersey
People from Tenafly, New Jersey
Sportspeople from Bergen County, New Jersey
Soccer players from New Jersey
American soccer players
Association football defenders
St. Benedict's Preparatory School alumni
North Carolina Tar Heels men's soccer players
Raleigh Flyers players
PEC Zwolle players
Sparta Rotterdam players
SC Cambuur players
Crystal Palace F.C. players
FC Energie Cottbus players
TSV 1860 Munich players
LA Galaxy players
Eerste Divisie players
Eredivisie players
English Football League players
2. Bundesliga players
Bundesliga players
Major League Soccer players
United States men's under-20 international soccer players
United States men's international soccer players
American soccer coaches
LA Galaxy non-playing staff
Hammarby Fotboll managers
Columbus Crew coaches
United States men's national soccer team managers
Major League Soccer coaches
1995 Copa América players
1998 CONCACAF Gold Cup players
1999 FIFA Confederations Cup players
2002 FIFA World Cup players
2003 FIFA Confederations Cup players
2006 FIFA World Cup players
2019 CONCACAF Gold Cup managers
2021 CONCACAF Gold Cup managers
American expatriate soccer players
Expatriate footballers in England
Expatriate footballers in the Netherlands
Expatriate football managers in Sweden
American expatriate sportspeople in the Netherlands
American expatriate sportspeople in England
American expatriate soccer players in Germany
American expatriate sportspeople in Sweden
American expatriate soccer coaches
2022 FIFA World Cup managers